Voodoos and Obeahs is a book by Joseph J. Williams published in 1932. Williams later wrote a companion book, Psychic Phenomena of Jamaica.

The book examines the history of voodoo and obeah in the Caribbean, specifically Jamaica and Haiti, traces them back to their roots in Africa and discusses the influence imperialism, slavery and racism had on their development.

External links 
 Voodoo and Obeahs (entire text)

1932 non-fiction books
Voodoo texts
History books about religion